Chris Apoua (born 30 January 1992) is a New Zealand rugby union player who plays for  in the National Provincial Championship. He also plays for the Super Rugby franchise, Moana Pasifika. His position is prop.

Reference list

External links
itsrugby.co.uk profile

1992 births
New Zealand rugby union players
Living people
Rugby union props
Moana Pasifika players
Northland rugby union players
SCM Rugby Timișoara players
Southland rugby union players
Rugby union players from Auckland